Bob Torrey may refer to:

 Robert Torrey (1878–1941), American football player and coach
 Bob Torrey (running back) (born 1957), American football running back